24/7 is a collaboration album by Gerald Albright & Norman Brown. The album was nominated for Best Pop Instrumental Album at the 55th Annual Grammy Awards.

Track listing 
 "In the Moment" (Gerald Albright) - 4:47
 "Keep it Moving" (Herman Jackson) - 5:03
 "Perfect Love" (Norman Brown, Dr. Farid Zarif) - 4:29
 "Buenos Amigos" (Albright) - 5:20
 "Tomorrow" (The Brothers Johnson) - 5:53
 "Yes I Can" (Brown) - 4:38
 "24/7" (Albright) - 5:59
 "Champagne Life" (David Dorohn, Shaffer Smith) - 5:22
 "The Best Is Yet to Come" (Brown, Jeanette Harris) - 4:41
 "Power of Your Smile" (Albright) - 5:00

Personnel 
 Gerald Albright – alto saxophone, baritone saxophone, tenor saxophone, flute, EWI, programming, bass guitar, percussion, backing vocals, arrangements, horn arrangements 
 Norman Brown – guitars, rhythm guitar 
 Phil Davis – keyboards 
 Tracy Carter – keyboards, arrangements
 Herman Jackson – keyboards, arrangements, horn arrangements
 Mark Cargill – programming, strings, harp
 Rick Watford – guitars, rhythm guitar 
 Byron Miller – bass 
 Ricky Lawson – drums 
 Charles Streeter – drums 
 Jay Williams – drums 
 Ray Ysalas – percussion 
 Jeanette Harris – horn arrangements
 Selina Albright – vocals, backing vocals 
 Rochella Brown – vocals 
 Demille Cole-Heard – vocals

Production 
 Mark Wexler – executive producer 
 Gerald Albright – producer, engineer  
 Norman Brown – producer, engineer 
 Herman Jackson – producer, engineer 
 Tracy Carter – engineer 
 Phil Davis – engineer 
 Ricky Lawson – engineer 
 Michael Vail Blum – engineer, mixing
 Rick Watford – engineer 
 Jay Williams – engineer 
 Don Murray – mixing 
 Paul Blakemore – mastering 
 Michael Stever – music copyist 
 Larissa Collins – art direction 
 Albert J. Roman – package design 
 Lori Stoll – photography

Charts

Weekly

Year-End

References

Norman Brown (guitarist) albums
2012 albums
Collaborative albums